Adriaen Foly (1664, in Copenhagen – 1701, in Copenhagen), was a Danish painter.

According to Houbraken he travelled to Italy and joined the Bentvueghels with the nickname "Zinnebeeld".

The Netherlands Institute for Art History claims he was in Rome with the Bentvueghels during the years 1664–1666. He was the same person as "A. Foolio" on engravings, and was probably known for miniature paintings.

References

1664 births
1701 deaths
Danish Baroque painters
Danish male painters
Artists from Copenhagen
Members of the Bentvueghels